This is a list of universities in Eswatini.

Universities in Eswatini
Limkokwing University of Creative Technology
Southern African Nazarene University
Eswatini Medical Christian University
University of Eswatini
Springfield Research University

References

External links
Universities in Swaziland

Universities
Eswatini
Eswatini